Diglycine may refer to:

 Glycylglycine
 Iminodiacetic acid